
Cho Oyu (Nepali: चोयु;) is the sixth-highest mountain in the world at  above sea level. Cho Oyu means "Turquoise Goddess" in Tibetan.  The mountain is the westernmost major peak of the Khumbu sub-section of the Mahalangur Himalaya 20 km west of Mount Everest.  The mountain stands on the China TibetNepal Province No. 1 border.

Just a few kilometres west of Cho Oyu is Nangpa La (5,716m/18,753 ft), a glaciated pass that serves as the main trading route between the Tibetans and the Khumbu's Sherpas. This pass separates the Khumbu and Rolwaling Himalayas.  Due to its proximity to this pass and the generally moderate slopes of the standard northwest ridge route, Cho Oyu is considered the easiest 8,000 metre peak to climb. It is a popular objective for professionally guided parties.

Height
A 1984 estimate of  made it move up to sixth place. New measurements made in 1996  by the Government of Nepal Survey Department and the Finnish Meteorological Institute in preparation for the Nepal Topographic Maps put the height at 8,188 m, one remarkably similar to the  used by Edmund Hillary in his 1955 book High Adventure.

Climbing history
Cho Oyu was first attempted in 1952 by an expedition organised and financed by the Joint Himalayan Committee of Great Britain as preparation for an attempt on Mount Everest the following year. The expedition was led by Eric Shipton and included Edmund Hillary, Tom Bourdillon and George Lowe.  A foray by Hillary and Lowe was stopped due to technical difficulties and avalanche danger at an ice cliff above  and a report of Chinese troops a short distance across the border influenced Shipton to retreat from the mountain rather than continue to attempt to summit.

The mountain was first climbed on October 19, 1954, via the north-west ridge by Herbert Tichy, Joseph Jöchler and Sherpa Pasang Dawa Lama of an Austrian expedition. Cho Oyu was the fifth 8000 metre peak to be climbed, after Annapurna in June 1950, Mount Everest in May 1953, Nanga Parbat in July 1953 and K2 in July 1954. Until the ascent of Mount Everest by Reinhold Messner and Peter Habeler in 1978, this was the highest peak climbed without supplemental oxygen.

Cho Oyu is considered the easiest eight-thousander, with the lowest death-summit ratio (th of Annapurna's). It is the second most climbed eight-thousander after Everest (whose height makes it the most popular), and has over four times the ascents of the third most popular eight-thousander, Gasherbrum II.  It is marketed as a "trekking peak", achievable for climbers with high fitness, but low mountaineering experience.  It has a broadly flat summit plateau with no cairn (the traditional prayer flags on Cho Oyu's summit plateau do not mark the "technical" summit), which can be a source of confusion, and debate, amongst climbers (see Elizabeth Hawley).

View

Timeline

1952 First reconnaissance of north-west face by Edmund Hillary and party.
1954 First ascent by Austrians Joseph Jöchler and Herbert Tichy, and Pasang Dawa Lama (Nepal)
1958 Second ascent of the peak, by an Indian expedition. Sherpa Pasang Dawa Lama reaches the peak for the second time. First death on Cho Oyu.
1959 Four members are killed in an avalanche during a failed international women's expedition.
1964 Controversial third ascent by a German expedition as there is no proof of reaching the summit.
1978 Edi Koblmüller and Alois Furtner of Austria summit via the extremely difficult southeast face.
1983 Reinhold Messner succeeds on his fourth attempt, with Hans Kammerlander and Michael Dacher.
1984 Věra Komárková (USA) and Dina Štěrbová (Czechoslovakia) become the first women to climb Cho Oyu. Štěrbová is also the first woman from Czechoslovakia to climb an 8000er.
1985 On February 12, Poles Maciej Berbeka and Maciej Pawlikowski make the first winter ascent via a new route on the southeast face. It is the only winter ascent on an eight-thousander made on a new route and the first winter ascent without additional oxygen support. The ascent was repeated three days later by Andrzej Heinrich and Jerzy Kukuczka, with Kukuczka setting an additional record for climbing two eight-thousanders during the same winter, as he had earlier climbed Dhaulagiri.
1988 On November 2, a Slovenian expedition consisting of Iztok Tomazin, Roman Robas, Blaž Jereb, Rado Nadvešnik, Marko Prezelj, and Jože Rozman, reach the summit via the never before climbed north face.
1994 On May 13 Carlos Carsolio sets a world record speed ascent from base camp to summit, ascending in 18 hours and 45 minutes.
1994 First solo ascent via the South West face by Yasushi Yamanoi.
2000 Russian-Finnish expedition of nine climbers summitted the top, but two of them disappeared in the attempt and presumed dead.   
2004 Second summit by a double amputee (Mark Inglis)
2007 Second Indian ascent. Expedition led by Abhilekh Singh Virdi.
2009 Clifton Maloney, husband of US Representative Carolyn Maloney and at that time the oldest American to summit an eight-thousander, died at age 71 after summiting on 25 September. His final words were "I’m the happiest man in the world. I’ve just summited a beautiful mountain."

See also

 1952 British Cho Oyu expedition
 Nangpa La shooting incident (in 2006) 
 Cho Oyu 8201m – Field Recordings from Tibet

Notes

References

Sources

Herbert Tichy, Cho Oyu - Gnade der Götter, (Vienna: Ullstein 1955)

External links

 Cho Oyu page on Summitpost.org
 Cho Oyu page on Himalaya-Info.org (German)
 
 Ascents and fatalities statistics
 Cho Oyu from Kyrgyzstan
 Birdseye view video

Eight-thousanders of the Himalayas
Mountains of Tibet
China–Nepal border
International mountains of Asia
Mountains of Koshi Province